Marquise is a 1997 French dramatic film directed by Véra Belmont, and starring Sophie Marceau, Bernard Giraudeau, and Lambert Wilson. Written by Jean-François Josselin, Véra Belmont, Marcel Beaulieu and Gérard Mordillat, the film is about a dancer and actress, based on the historical actress Marquise-Thérèse de Gorla, who rises from obscurity to win the hearts of some of France's most prominent citizens, including Moliere, Racine, and King Louis XIV. She is helped in her career by a rotund comic, who falls in love with her, marries her, and brings her to Paris to launch her career. Despite her intimate involvement with other men, she keeps a special place in her heart reserved only for her unlikely spouse. Set in seventeenth century France, the film was shot on location in Lombardy and Emilia-Romagna, Italy, from September through December 1996.

Marquise was released on 20 August 1997 in France, and on 12 September 1997 in the United States. The film received generally positive reviews, with Variety magazine's Lisa Nesselson calling it "entertaining without being taxing", and Paul Fischer on the Urban Cinefile website calling it "masterful entertainment on a grand scale, an intelligent and fascinating insight into 17th century French society". Marquise was nominated for the AFI Fest Grand Jury Prize, the British Independent Film Award for Best Foreign Independent Film, and the César Award for Best Music.

Plot
While four actresses from Molière's itinerant theatrical troupe set off looking for a latrine, Molière (Bernard Giraudeau) and his best friend Gros-Rene (Patrick Timsit) discover Marquise (Sophie Marceau) dancing before an eager crowd of men. Her movements are provocative and are heightened by a heavy rain that drenches her hair and clothes. The men offer her coins for her performance, which are pocketed by Marquise's father. Gros-Rene immediately falls in love with Marquise. While an elderly gentlemen has his way with her, Gros-Rene proposes to her, promising that she will end up on a Paris stage if she accepts, which she does.

Although the beautiful Marquise and the balding portly Gros-Rene make an unlikely couple, their relationship is sustained by his unquestioning adoration and her reciprocal affection. While Marquise continues to sleep with other men, her love for her husband is unchanging. Marquise is next attracted to the budding playwright Racine (Lambert Wilson), who "coaches" her privately. When Louis XIV (Thierry Lhermitte) bans Molière's Tartuffe, Racine writes a new tragedy Andromaque and Marquise gets her big break. Marquise's performance in Andromaque brings her acclaim. Written for his beloved in 1667, the tragedy assured Racine's reputation as a playwright. Unfortunately, the performances take their toll on Marquise and lead to a tragic end.

Cast

 Sophie Marceau as Marquise
 Bernard Giraudeau as Molière
 Lambert Wilson as Racine
 Patrick Timsit as Gros René
 Thierry Lhermitte as Louis XIV
 Anémone as La Voisin
 Remo Girone as Jean-Baptiste Lully
 Georges Wilson as Floridor
 Franck de la Personne as Monsieur Phillipe d'Orleans
 Marianne Basler as Madame Henrietta of England
 Romina Mondello as Armande
 Estelle Skornik as Marie
 Victoria Peña as Queen Maria Theresa of Spain
 Christine Joly as Madeleine
 Olivier Achard as Monsieur de Saint-Loup
 Patrice Melennec as Giacomo de Gorla père de Marquise
 Anne-Marie Philipe as Catherine de Brie
 Christine Joly as Madeleine Béjart
 Beatrice Palme as Geneviève
 Francisco Casares as Gorgibus (as Paco Casares)
 Guillermo Antón as Charles
 Eric Boucher as Brécourt
 Stéphane Boucher as Louis Béjart

Production
Marquise was filmed on location in Sabbioneta, Mantua in Lombardy, Italy, and in Soragna, Parma in Emilia-Romagna, Italy. Principal photography ran from September through the end of December 1996. Scenes of the royal court were filmed at Vaux-le-Vicomte.

Release
Marquise was released on 20 August 1997 in France. The film was released in the United States the following month, on 12 September 1997. It was shown at the Venice International Film Festival from 27 August through 6 September 1997, at the Toronto International Film Festival 4–13 September 1997, and at a special screening at the Tokyo International Film Festival 1–10 November 1997.

Reception

Critical response
The film received generally positive reviews. In her review for Variety magazine, Lisa Nesselson described the film as being "entertaining without being taxing". Nesselson went on to write:

Applauding the performances, Nesselson wrote, "Robust and spirited without showing off, Marceau has all the creamy-breasted allure and most of the grace required to turn heads and accrue glory. As her husband, Timsit is ardent and touching. And in a far from obvious casting choice, Lhermitte scores as the King." Nesselson praised Jordi Savall's score, calling it"a delight", and applauded the "alacrity" of the cinematography and editing, which effectively convey the "mud, muck and rabble as well as the sumptuous pomp of the day."

In her review for Urban Cinefile, Lousie Keller described the film as "a colourful period piece that captures the lusty spirit of the 17th century with its fire, frivolity and passion." Keller praised the entire "top notch" cast for their performances:

Keller also praised the "excellent" production design, the "beguiling" cinematography, and the director, Vera Belmont, who "invests passion and energy in this entertaining romp which delicately balances comedy and tragedy on the fickle seesaw of life."

In his review for Urban Cinefile, Paul Fischer called the film "lavish, sexy, funny, poignant" and a "masterful entertainment on a grand scale, an intelligent and fascinating insight into 17th century French society." Fischer singled out the performance of Sophie Marceau and her portrayal of the "luminous" Marquise:

Fischer also praised the production design and cinematography, in what he described as a visually "breathtaking, beautifully shot and costumed" period piece:

Accolades

References

External links
 
 
 
 

1997 films
1990s adventure films
French historical films
1990s French-language films
Films set in the 1600s
Cultural depictions of Molière
Jean Racine
1990s French films